Brigadny (masculine), Brigadnaya (feminine), or Brigadnoye (neuter) is the name of several rural localities in Russia:
Brigadny (rural locality), a settlement in Novopokrovsky Rural Okrug of Primorsko-Akhtarsky District of Krasnodar Krai
Brigadnoye, Kaliningrad Oblast, a settlement in Turgenevsky Rural Okrug of Polessky District of Kaliningrad Oblast
Brigadnoye, Leningrad Oblast, a logging depot settlement under the administrative jurisdiction of Priozerskoye Settlement Municipal Formation, Priozersky District, Leningrad Oblast